Andrew Crescenzi (born July 29, 1992) is a Canadian professional ice hockey centre for Bozen–Bolzano of the Austrian Hockey League (EBEL). He has formerly played for the Los Angeles Kings of the National Hockey League (NHL).

Playing career
Crescenzi first played junior hockey with the Villanova Knights in the Ontario Junior Hockey League. He was selected in the 2008 OHL Priority Draft, 128th overall by the Kitchener Rangers. He later made his debut in the Ontario Hockey League with the Rangers in the 2009–10 season, compiling 12 points.

Undrafted, Crescenzi was invited to the Toronto Maple Leafs 2010 rookie and main roster training camp. He impressed the organization with his physical checking presence and was signed as a free agent to a three-year, entry-level contract on September 29, 2010. At the conclusion his second season of major junior with the Rangers in 2010–11, Crescenzi made his professional debut in appearing in 2 games with the Maple Leafs affiliate, the Toronto Marlies of the AHL

After three seasons with the Kitchener Rangers, Crescenzi embarked on his professional career in the 2012–13 season. He split his rookie season between the Marlies and the San Francisco Bulls of the ECHL.

In the 2013–14 season, Crescenzi remained assigned to the Marlies, however was unable to contribute offensively posting 3 points in 32 contests. On January 22, 2014, Crescenzi was traded by the Maple Leafs to the Los Angeles Kings in exchange for Brandon Kozun. He was immediately assigned to play out the remainder of the season in the AHL with the Manchester Monarchs.

After attending his first Kings training camp the following summer, Crescenzi was familiary assigned to continue his tenure with the Monarchs. He improved upon his previous seasons to post 7 goals and 15 points in 54 regular season games. Crescenzi appeared in 18 postseason games, as the Monarchs claimed the Calder Cup in their last season in the AHL.

On July 16, 2015, Crescenzi was signed as a restricted free agent to a one-year contract extension to remain within the Kings organization. He played two further seasons in the AHL with new affiliate the Ontario Reign, before he was re-signed to a one-year, two-way contract extension on July 14, 2017.

In the 2017–18 season, Crescenzi was selected as an alternate captain in his third year with the Reign. On November 14, 2017, Crescenzi received his first recall by the Kings to the NHL. Added to provide a physical spark, Crescenzi made his NHL debut with the Kings that night registering 2 penalty minutes in a 3–2 defeat to the Vancouver Canucks. After two games with the Kings he was returned to the Reign on November 19, 2017.

As a free agent from the Kings in the following off-season, Crescenzi left after five seasons within the organization and signed with Bozen–Bolzano of the Austrian Hockey League (EBEL), on August 9, 2018.

Career statistics

Awards and honors

References

External links
 

1992 births
Bolzano HC players
Canadian ice hockey centres
Kitchener Rangers players
Living people
Los Angeles Kings players
Manchester Monarchs (AHL) players
Ontario Reign (AHL) players
San Francisco Bulls players
Toronto Marlies players
Undrafted National Hockey League players
People from Thornhill, Ontario
Ice hockey people from Ontario